Darvin Kidsy Jr. (born March 19, 1995) is an American football wide receiver. He played college football at North Texas and Texas Southern. He has also been a member of the Washington Redskins, Seattle Seahawks, Saskatchewan Roughriders, and Houston Gamblers.

College career
Kidsy began his career at the University of North Texas, where he played for three seasons. He appeared 36 games, catching 48 passes for 539 yards and two touchdowns. He transferred to Texas Southern University after his junior year and was forced to sit out the 2016 season due to NCAA transfer rules. In his redshirt senior season, Kidsy had 38 receptions for 519 yards and three touchdowns.

Professional career

Washington Redskins/Football Team
Kidsy signed with the Washington Football Team as an undrafted free agent on May 14, 2018 after participating in a rookie minicamp with the team. He was cut by the Redskins at the end of training camp and subsequently re-signed to the team's practice squad on September 2, 2018. Kidsy was promoted to the Redskins active roster on December 20, 2018. He made his NFL debut on December 22, 2018 against the Tennessee Titans. He caught his first career pass, an eight-yard reception from Josh Johnson, in the Redskins’ final game of the season against the Philadelphia Eagles.

On August 31, 2019, Kidsy was waived by the Redskins. He was re-signed to the practice squad on October 2, 2019. He was promoted to the active roster on December 7, 2019, before being waived again on August 31, 2020.

Seattle Seahawks
Kidsy signed with the Seattle Seahawks' practice squad on December 2, 2020, and was released six days later. Kidsy signed a futures contract with the Seahawks on January 29, 2021. He was waived on August 5, 2021, when the Seahawks signed former Iowa State basketball player Michael Jacobson to the preseason camp roster.

Saskatchewan Roughriders
Kidsy signed with the Saskatchewan Roughriders of the Canadian Football League on January 24, 2022. He was released on May 14.

Houston Gamblers
Kidsy signed with the Houston Gamblers of the United States Football League on May 19, 2022, and was subsequently transferred to the team's inactive roster the next day. He was released on May 27.

References

External links
Seattle Seahawks bio
Texas Southern Tigers bio
North Texas Mean Green bio

1995 births
Living people
American football wide receivers
Houston Gamblers (2022) players
North Texas Mean Green football players
People from Missouri City, Texas
Players of American football from Texas
Seattle Seahawks players
Sportspeople from Harris County, Texas
Texas Southern Tigers football players
Washington Redskins players